Hannah Darling (born July 2003) is a Scottish amateur golfer. She played in the Curtis Cup in 2021 and 2022. Since 2021, she has attended the University of South Carolina.

Golf career
In July 2017, Darling became the youngest winner of the Scottish Girls' Amateur Championship, aged 13, and she played for Scotland in the Girls Home Internationals the following month. In 2018, she was the inaugural winner of the British Girls U16 Amateur Golf Championship, finishing two strokes ahead of Beth Coulter. She also repeated her success in the Scottish Girls' Amateur Championship, beating Louise Duncan, 4 and 3, in the final. In April 2019, she won the Scottish Girls' Open Championship with a score of 209, six strokes ahead of the runner-up. Later in 2019, she competed for Great Britain & Ireland in the Junior Vagliano Trophy, for Scotland in the European Ladies' Team Championship and the Women's Home Internationals and for Europe in the Junior Solheim Cup.

Darling had a good run of results in 2021. Between the end of May to early July, she won the St Rule Trophy, was a semi-finalist in the Scottish Women's Amateur Championship and the Women's Amateur Championship, and was a runner-up in the Helen Holm Scottish Women's Open Championship. In August, she won the Girls Amateur Championship beating Beth Coulter in the final. She also played in the 2021 Curtis Cup. Darling also had the lowest individual score in the qualifying stage of the 2021 European Ladies' Team Championship.

Since the autumn of 2021, she has attended the University of South Carolina. In 2022, she competed in the Curtis Cup for the second time, and again reached the semi-finals of the Women's Amateur Championship. She again led the individual scoring in  the qualifying stage of the European Ladies' Team Championship.

Amateur wins
2017 Scottish Girls' Amateur Championship
2018 Scottish Girls' Amateur Championship, British Girls U16 Amateur Golf Championship
2019 Scottish Girls' Open Championship
2021 St Rule Trophy, Girls Amateur Championship

Source:

Team appearances
Amateur
Girls Home Internationals (representing Scotland): 2017, 2018
European Girls' Team Championship (representing Scotland): 2018
Junior Vagliano Trophy: (representing Great Britain & Ireland): 2019
European Ladies' Team Championship (representing Scotland): 2019, 2021, 2022
Women's Home Internationals (representing Scotland): 2019, 2021
Junior Solheim Cup (representing Europe): 2019
Curtis Cup (representing Great Britain & Ireland): 2021, 2022
Espirito Santo Trophy (representing Scotland): 2022

Source:

References

Scottish female golfers
Amateur golfers
South Carolina Gamecocks women's golfers
2003 births
Living people